László Sólymos (born 16 November 1968) is a Slovak politician of Hungarian ethnicity from the former Most-Híd party who was the Minister of Environment of Slovakia from 23 March 2016 to 28 January 2020. He resigned after a drunken incident in a Bratislava restaurant in which he and his brother caused EUR 1,000 in damage, and was replaced by Árpád Érsek from the same party.

References

1968 births
Living people
Government ministers of Slovakia
Most–Híd politicians